Arfanabad (also Romanized as ʿArfānābād) is a village in Katul Rural District, in the Central District of Aliabad County, Golestan Province, Iran. At the 2006 census, its population was 904, in 185 families.

References 

Populated places in Aliabad County